One Flew Over the Cuckoo's Nest may refer to:

 One Flew Over the Cuckoo's Nest (novel), a 1962 novel by Ken Kesey
 One Flew Over the Cuckoo's Nest (play), a 1963 stage adaptation of the novel starring Kirk Douglas
 One Flew Over the Cuckoo's Nest (film), a 1975 film adaptation of the novel starring Jack Nicholson

See also
 "One Flew Over the Cuckoo Clock", episode of The Green Green Grass
 "One Flew Out of the Cuckoo's Nest", the two-part final episode of The Golden Girls
 Cuckoo's nest (disambiguation)

Bureaucracy in fiction
One Flew Over the Cuckoo's Nest